Udanpaal is a 2022 Indian Tamil-language comedy drama film directed by Karthik Seenivasan and starring Linga, Gayathrie and Vivek Prasanna in the lead roles. It was released on 30 December 2022 in Aha Tamil.

Cast
Linga as Parama
Gayathrie as Kanmani
Vivek Prasanna as Murali
Abarnathy as Prema
Charle as Vinayagam
Dheena as Parthiban
Dharshith Santosh as Vigan
Mayilsamy

Production
The ensemble cast shot the entire film in one schedule in the same location. In early December 2022, the makers of the film announced that they had decided to skip its theatrical release and release it on the aha Tamil platform.

Reception
The film was released on 30 December 2022 on the aha Tamil platform, with reviews from critics being released during the week prior to release. A reviewer from Times of India wrote "it's not often you get to watch a quirky, innovative family drama - and, especially when the film manages to double as a dark comedy, you can't help but buy it". The critic added that "Udanpaal, directed by debutant Karthik Sreenivasan, is a product of effective writing that tells you how to engage the audience with a small number of characters and their morbid actions". Critic Manigandan K. R. wrote "director Karthik Seenivasan’s Udanpaal is an exceptionally well made dark comedy drama that, while making us laugh, also makes us ponder about the deteriorating standards of individuals when it comes to morality, gratitude and love". Reviewers from The Hindu and Nakkheeran also gave the film positive reviews.

References

2022 films
2020s Tamil-language films
Aha (streaming service) original films